Laura Troubridge, Lady Troubridge, (née Gurney; 1867 – 8 July 1946) was a British novelist and etiquette writer. She wrote almost 60 novels and many short stories.

Life 
Lady Troubridge (nee Gurney) was born in 1867 in London, England. She was the daughter of Charles Henry Gurney and Alice Marie Prinsep and granddaughter of Henry Thoby Prinsep and Sara Monckton (nee Pattle).

Her father died when she was 11 years old, and her sister, Rachel who later married William Ward, 2nd Earl of Dudley, was 10.  In 1897 her mother married a second time, to Colonel John Bourchier Stracey-Clitherow who in 1900 took up residence at Hotham Hall in East Riding, and later, after the death of his father in 1912, Boston Manor. The Washington Post in 1907 states Troubridge 'is the only sister of young Lady Sybil Dudley who as an orphan was adopted by the Duke of Bedford'.  But in the same article also states Troubridge was 'orphaned at a tender age' which seems in conflict with other sources showing her mother died in 1919 when Troubridge was 52 years old.  Adding to confusion about Troubridge's early life, Baroness Franzisca von Hedeman states 'Rachel Gurney...was brought up by the Marchioness of Tavistock, now Adeline, Duchess of Bedford...Her sister, Laura Gurney, now Lady Trowbridge, who is much admired for her literary taste, was brought up by her Aunt, Lady Henry Somerset, well known in America." Whatever the exact circumstances of her childhood, Troubridge spent much of her youth in Somerset's house where the refined library atmosphere influenced her future as a writer.    

She married her cousin Sir Thomas Herbert Cochrane Troubridge, 4th Baronet, on 13 July 1893. They had two daughters and one son.  In 1930 their home, Ole Ways in Beaulieu, was completely destroyed by fire ‘Lady Troubridge who is a well-known authoress, lost hundreds of sheets of typescript.  She was at her desk when the outbreak occurred, but managed to save the manuscripts on which she was engaged.’

She died on 8 July 1946 and was buried at Abbey Church, Beaulieu, Hampshire.

Career 
She wrote under her title, Lady Troubridge, and authored almost three dozen novels, numerous short stories and, newspaper serial stories and articles.

Her first novel, Paul’s Stepmother, and One Other Story, was published in 1896.  After a lapse of some years she wrote her first essay, Thou Woman Thou Gavest, in 1906.  It was a brilliant success and was followed by almost annual publications until the late 1930s.

Troubridge published The Millionaire in 1907 and it caused a sensation.  The Washington Post wrote: 'Lady Troubridge, the facile romancist, whose latest novel, “The Millionaire”, created a sensation in England'  and continues, she 'depicts in classic style the trials of a young girl who leaves a dingy home in the suburbs of London to take her place in cosmopolitan society.  Throughout the story the secret sins of the upper classes are laid bare…and the innocent who are grabbed by the tentacles of the social octopus find it a herculean task to rescue themselves from its clutches.'

His Grace Gives Notice was published in 1922.  It has been dramatised in film twice.  Once in 1924 and a second time in 1933.NOTICE

Our English law of succession by which a man may inherit the titles and estates of a noble House of which he is a remote and obscure member is the only explanation of much which, to the uninitiated, seems, and would otherwise be, incredible.  The annals of great families contain records of many strange events of which the world at large knows nothing.  These family secrets, more or less well kept, are often merely sordid and melodramatic; but now and then an event occurs which is singularly full of real romance.  Though you may not find the Duke of St. Bevis in Burke or Debrett, perhaps you may have seen his prototype adorning some humble station, or may meet him later without ever realizing what he has owed to the accident of fortune. - Lady Troubridge, His Grace Gives Notice (1922)On her book Memories and Reflections (1925) The Guardian wrote that she had “all the advantages of the most fortunate autobiographers…She has been from childhood in the habit of mixing with beautiful, fashionable and even interesting people”  Her memoirs included comments on places she had been, her experiences and people she met. 'She has been on both sides of the Channel, to the places where “everybody” goes' and knew fellow authors, such as Belloe Lownders and Stephen McKenan, and met royalty, King Edward VII and Queen Victoria.  The Guardian continues "Altogether this is a good natured, attractive and chatty book..and the pictures of the authoress' childhood…is particularly pleasant."

She wrote The Book of Etiquette which was first published in 1926. Over the following six decades, until 1987, a further 29 editions were published.  In 1939 My Home published excerpts from it as a booklet titled Etiquette and Entertaining.  The Book of Etiquette, unlike its predecessors, was focused on a British audience. It was a thorough guide to English social etiquette in upper class society. It intended to help readers steer their way through ‘unwritten laws’ of social behaviour and between old-fashion courtesy and the new spirit of informality.  Troubridge became well respected for her views on etiquette even before The Book of Etiquette.  The Sheboygan Press, for example, quoted her as the authority on ‘When to Propose Marriage’ in 1911.  Her reputation on all things etiquette extended beyond her life.  For the film Gosford Park released in 2002, The Book of Etiquette was given to cast members to use for researching etiquette during the 1930s.

She wrote seven society novels for Mills & Boon between 1909 and 1912: The Woman who Forgot; The First Law; The Cheat; Body and Soul; Stormlight; The Girl with the Blue Eyes; and The Creature of Circumstance.

Her short stories were published in magazines such as Britannia and Eve, Cassell's Magazine of Fiction, Marks & Spencer’s Grand Annual, Miss Modern, Nash’s Magazine, The Grand Magazine, The Lady’s Realm, The London Magazine, The Novel Magazine, The Pall Mall Magazine, The Red Magazine, The Sovereign Magazine, The Story-teller and The Yellow Magazine.  Troubridge also wrote serial stories for newspapers, The True Heart in 1915 for the Staffordshire Sentinel, is an example of such a story.  Her opinions, stories and letters appeared in newspapers far as Australia such as the Sydney Morning Herald and the Daily News (Perth).

Towards the end of her life she wrote for the women’s magazine Home Chat as an agony aunt.

Novels 

 Paul's Stepmother, and One Other Story, 1896
 The Woman Thou Gavest, 1906 
 The Millionaire, 1907
 House Of Cards, 1908
 Marriage Of Blackmail, 1909
 The Cheat, 1909
 The First Law, 1909
 The Woman Who Forgot, 1910
 Body And Soul, 1911
 Storm-Light, 1912
 The Creature Of Circumstance, 1912
 The Girl With The Blue Eyes, 1912
 The Unguarded Hour, 1913
 This Man And This Woman, 1913
 The Half Of His Kingdom, 1915
 The Evil Day, 1916
 Mrs Vernon's Daughter, 1917
 All's Well, Billy, 1918
 O, Perfect Love, 1920
 His Grace Gives Notice, 1922
 Passion Flower, 1923
 Memories And Reflections, 1925
 Dangerous Bonds, 1926
 The Book of Etiquette, 2 volumes, 1926
 The Dusty Angel, 1927
 Exit Marriage, 1929
 The Purse Strings, 1929
 The Story Of Leonora, 1930
 Life Of The Late Lord Montagu Of Beaulieu, with Archibald Marshall, 1930
 The Property Of A Gentleman, 1931
 The Marriages Of Georgia, 1932
 The Brighthavens At Home, 1934
 Etiquette and Entertaining: To Help You On Your Social Way, 1939
 None but the Brave

References

External links 

The Creature of Circumstance by Lady Troubridge at HathiTrust
The Book of Etiquette by Lady Troubridge at HathiTrust
Nash's Pall Mall Magazine (1900), Her Boy, Lady Troubridge at Internet Archive
‘My Home’ Etiquette Book by Lady Troubridge at National Museum of Ireland
A List of Short Stories by Lady Troubridge (1867-1946) at The FictionMags Index
His Grace Gives Notice by Lady Troubridge at HathiTrust
Author names starting with  Tr,  Lady, (Laura) TROUBRIDGE, nee GURNEY {UK} (F: c1865 - 1946 Jul 8)  at New General Catalog of Old Books and Authors

1867 births
1946 deaths
19th-century British women writers
20th-century British women writers
British women novelists
19th-century British novelists
20th-century British novelists
Wives of baronets